Peter Jackson (born 1961) is a New Zealand-born filmmaker.

Peter Jackson may also refer to:

Academics
 Peter Jackson (academic), Australian writer and scholar of sexual politics and Buddhism in Thailand
 Peter Jackson (scientist) (1949–2011), scientist at Thomson Reuters Corporation
 Peter Jackson (historian), British scholar and historian, author on the history of the Crusades, in particular the Mongols
 Peter Jackson (conservationist) (1926–2016), British journalist, photographer, tiger conservationist and author
 Peter Wyse Jackson (born 1955), Irish botanist
 Peter Jackson (geographer) (born 1955), British human geographer
 Peter Jackson (meteorologist) (born 1961), Canadian meteorologist

Politics and law
 Peter Jackson (judge) (born 1955), English Court of Appeal judge
 Peter Jackson (politician) (1928–2020), British Labour Party Member of Parliament for High Peak 1966–1970

Sports

Association football (soccer)
 Peter Jackson (footballer, born 1905) (1905–1986), English footballer and football manager
 Peter Jackson (footballer, born 1937) (1937–1991), his son, English footballer
 Peter Jackson (footballer, born 1961) (born 1961), English footballer and football manager

Boxing
 Peter Jackson (boxer) (1861–1901), Australian World Colored Heavyweight Champion boxer also known as "Peter the Great"
 Young Peter Jackson (boxer, born 1877) (1877–1923), American welterweight boxer known as "The Baltimore Demon"
 Young Peter Jackson (boxer, born 1912) (1912–1979), American lightweight boxer

Other sports
 Peter Jackson (cricketer) (1911–1999), English cricketer who played for Worcestershire
 Peter H. Jackson (1912–1983), English silver medallist in rowing at the 1936 Summer Olympics
 Peter Jackson (rugby union) (1930–2004), English rugby union footballer
 Peter Jackson (tennis) (1934–2014), Irish tennis player
 Peter Jackson (sailor) (born 1945), sailor for the U.S. Virgin Islands
 Peter Jackson (rugby league) (1964–1997), Australian rugby league footballer
 Peter Jackson (table tennis) (born 1964), New Zealand table tennis player

Fiction
 Peter Jackson, a fictional character in the Stephen King novels Desperation and The Regulators
 Peter Jackson, a fictional character in the 1969 Michael Crichton novel The Andromeda Strain
 Peter Jackson, Cigar Merchant, a 1919 novel by Gilbert Frankau

Others
 Peter Jackson, a pseudonym for Ernest Hemingway during his second stay in Toronto
 Peter Jackson (artist) (1922–2003), artist who ran a documentary cartoon strip in the London Evening News, giving glimpses of London's history
 Peter Jackson (journalist) (born 1950), American journalist
 Pete Jackson, American singer, songwriter, member of singing band Touch of Class
 Peter Jackson (fashion designer) (1928–2008), Australian men's fashion outfitter and fashion designer
 Peter Jackson, a brand of cigarettes owned by Imperial Tobacco
 Peter Jackson (businessman) (born 1975), British businessman, CEO of Paddy Power Betfair